The Gailis cabinet was the government of Latvia from 19 September 1994 to 21 December 1995.  It was led by Prime Minister Māris Gailis.  It took office on 19 September 1994, after the resignation of Valdis Birkavs.  It was replaced by the first Šķēle cabinet on 21 December 1995, after the September and October 1995 election.

Government of Latvia
1994 establishments in Latvia
1995 disestablishments in Latvia
Cabinets established in 1994
Cabinets disestablished in 1995